John George Herbert, 8th Earl of Powis (born 19 May 1952), styled Viscount Clive between 1988 and 1993, is a British peer. He sat in the House of Lords between 1993 and 1999.

Early life
Herbert is the son of George William Herbert, 7th Earl of Powis and the Hon. Katharine Odeyne de Grey. Among his siblings are Hon. Michael Clive Herbert, Hon. Peter James Herbert, Hon. Edward David Herbert, Lorraine Elizabeth Herbert, and Nicola Wendy Herbert.

His paternal grandparents were The Right Rev. Percy Herbert Bishop of Norwich, and the former Hon. Elaine Orde-Powlett (a daughter of William Orde-Powlett, 5th Baron Bolton). His maternal grandparents were Lt. Col. George de Grey, 8th Baron Walsingham and the former Hyacinth Lambart Bouwens.

He was expelled from his school, Wellington College, at the age of 14 or 15, and says that he became anti-imperialist at that time. He later graduated from McMaster University, in Ontario, Canada, with a Master of Arts and, in 1994, with a Doctor of Philosophy.

Career
Herbert was an assistant professor at Redeemer College in Hamilton, Ontario between 1990 and 1992.

Upon the death of his father on 13 August 1993, he succeeded as the 8th Earl of Powis in addition to a number of other subsidiary titles.

In 2021, during the second episode of Empire State of Mind, Lord Powis told journalist Sathnam Sanghera that he wished a statue of his ancestor, Clive of India, was not in the centre of Shrewsbury.

Personal life
Herbert married Marijke Sofia Guther, daughter of Maarten Nanne Guther and Woutertje Bouw, in 1977. They have four children:

 Jonathan Nicholas William Herbert, Viscount Clive (b. 1979).
 Lady Stephanie Moira Christina Herbert (b. 1982).
 Lady Samantha Julie Esther Herbert (b. 1988).
 Hon. Alexander Sebastian George Herbert (b. 1994).

"The Herbert family still live in part of Powis Castle, under arrangement with the National Trust." The Castle contains "an array of Mughal artifacts picked up by Clive and his family".

References

External links

John Herbert, 8th Earl of Powis

1952 births
Living people
Earls of Powis
John

Powis